Hans Koch  (16 August 1893 – 24 April 1945) was a German lawyer, a member of the Confessional Church and a member of the German resistance against Nazism.

Koch was born in Bartenstein, East Prussia (modern Bartoszyce, Poland), he graduated in law from the University of Königsberg.  In 1923, he began working at the Prussian Ministry of Trade and later as the second state commisar of the Berlin stock exchange. In 1927, he opened his own law office. In 1937, he helped win an acquittal for pastor Martin Niemöller.

During World War II, he developed contacts with Claus von Stauffenberg and the 20 July plot conspirators, including Carl Goerdeler.  In the 20 July plot, once the Nazis had been routed, Koch was slated to become the presiding judge of the Reichsgericht, the highest court in the German Reich. The plot failed, however, and Koch sheltered one of the conspirators. An informer denounced him and Koch and his family were arrested. He was murdered extrajudicially in Berlin by a Sonderkommando of the SS-Reichssicherheitshauptamt on 24 April 1945.

References 

1893 births
1945 deaths
People from Bartoszyce
People from East Prussia
Executed members of the 20 July plot
Protestants in the German Resistance
University of Königsberg alumni
German people executed by Nazi Germany
Extrajudicial killings in World War II
Resistance members killed by Nazi Germany